Appleby is a city in Nacogdoches County, in the U.S. state of Texas. The population was 474 at the 2010 census.

Geography

Appleby is located at  (31.717968, –94.607731).

Demographics

As of the 2010 census Appleby had a population of 474.  The racial and ethnic composition of the population was 92.6% white, 2.7% black or African American, 1.3% Native American, 1.1% Vietnamese, 0.2% other Asian, 1.9% reporting some other race and 0.2% from two or more races.  5.9% of the population was Hispanic or Latino of any race.
 
As of the census of 2000, there were 444 people, 179 households, and 134 families residing in the city. The population density was 207.1 people per square mile (80.1/km2). There were 196 housing units at an average density of 91.4 per square mile (35.4/km2). The racial makeup of the city was 90.77% White, 6.53% African American, 0.45% Asian, 0.90% from other races, and 1.35% from two or more races. Hispanic or Latino of any race were 3.15% of the population.

There were 179 households, out of which 31.3% had children under the age of 18 living with them, 65.9% were married couples living together, 6.7% had a female householder with no husband present, and 24.6% were non-families. 20.7% of all households were made up of individuals, and 9.5% had someone living alone who was 65 years of age or older. The average household size was 2.48 and the average family size was 2.84.

In the city, the population was spread out, with 22.5% under the age of 18, 9.9% from 18 to 24, 27.7% from 25 to 44, 25.9% from 45 to 64, and 14.0% who were 65 years of age or older. The median age was 38 years. For every 100 females, there were 100.0 males. For every 100 females age 18 and over, there were 93.3 males.

The median income for a household in the city was $45,568, and the median income for a family was $53,929. Males had a median income of $36,667 versus $23,375 for females. The per capita income for the city was $26,548. About 4.9% of families and 8.1% of the population were below the poverty line, including 1.0% of those under age 18 and 5.0% of those age 65 or over.

Education
The City of Appleby is served by the Nacogdoches Independent School District and is home to the Golden Dragons. The Nacogdoches Independent School District is made up of ten schools, including Brooks Quinn Jones Elementary School, Carpenter Elementary School, Fredonia Elementary School, Martin Education Center For Achievement, McMichael Middle School,
Mike Moses Middle School, Nacogdoches High School, Nettie Marshall Elementary School, Raguet Elementary School and Thomas J. Rusk Elementary.

Notable people

 Ira L. Hanna (1908–1978), 36th Mayor of Cheyenne, Wyoming

References

Cities in Texas
Cities in Nacogdoches County, Texas